Blastobasis tridigitella is a moth in the family Blastobasidae. It is found in Thailand.

The length of the forewings is 6–7.8 mm. The forewings have greyish-brown scales intermixed with brown scales, each tipped with pale grey. The hindwings are pale grey.

Etymology
The species name is derived from Latin tri (meaning three) and digitus (meaning finger) and refers to the three finger-like projections arising from the costa and the lower part of the valva.

References

Moths described in 2003
Blastobasis